
This is a list of aircraft in alphabetical order beginning with 'D'.

D-De

D'Apuzzo
see also: de Knight, Parsons-Jocelyn
 D'Apuzzo D-200 Freshman
 D'Apuzzo D-200 Junior Aero Sport
 D'Apuzzo D-260 Senior Aero Sport
 D'Apuzzo D-295 Senior Aero Sport
 D'Apuzzo D-201 Sportwing

D'Ascanio 
(Corradino D'Ascanio, Italy)
 D'Ascanio Helicopter (1930)

Dabos
(Jean Dabos)
 Dabos Roitelet
 Dabos JD.24P D'Artagnan

Dabos-Cholot
(Jean Dabos & Jacques Cholot)
 DC.01 Rapace

Dabos-Masclet
(Jean Dabos et Masclet)
see Avions JDM

Dąbrowski
 Dąbrowski D.1 Cykacz
 Dąbrowski D.2

DAC
(Dutch Aeroplane Company, Dordrecht, Netherlands)
DAC RangeR

Daedalus 
(Daedalus Research Group, Petersburg, VA)
 GTP-350

Daewoo
 Daewoo SHI KTX-1

Daher
 Daher Kodiak 100
 Daher Kodiak 900
 Daher TBM 700
 Daher TBM 850
 Daher TBM 900
 Daher TBM 910
 Daher TBM 930

Daiichi Kosho
Daiichi Kosho Beat
Daiichi Kosho Whisper

Daily 
(H M Daily, Chicago, IL)
 Daily Old glory

Daimler
(Daimler Motorengesellschaft Werke)
 Daimler CL.I 
 Daimler D.I
 Daimler D.II
 Daimler G.I (Daimler R.I)
 Daimler G.II (Daimler R.II)
 Daimler L6
 Daimler L8
 Daimler L9
 Daimler L11
 Daimler L14
 Daimler L15
 Daimler L20
 Daimler L21
 Daimler Lutskoy No. 1 monoplane

Dakota Cub 
 Dakota Cub Super 18-180 EXP
 Dakota Cub Super 18-160 EXP
 Dakota Cub Super 18-LT-EXP

Dal 
(Wayne Dalrymple & Charles Pheiffer, Wichita, KS)
 Dal Sport a.k.a. Dal Special

Dalby 
(Daniel Dalby)
 Dalby Pouchel

Dale 
(Glendale, MA)
 Dale Air-Dale

Dale
(Harold Dale)
 Dale Weejet 800

Dallach 
(WD Flugzeug Leichtbau /  Wolfgang Dallach)
 Dallach D.2 Sunrise
 Dallach Sunrise IIA
 Dallach Sunrise IIB
 Dallach Sunrise IIC
 Dallach Sunrise (Verner)
 Dallach D.3 Sunwheel
 Dallach D.4 Fascination
 Dallach D.4 BK Fascination
 Dallach D.5 Evolution

Dallair Aeronautica 
 Dallair Aeronautica FR-100 Snap!

Dalotel
 Dalotel DM-165
 Dalotel DM-125 Club
 Dalotel DM-160 Club
 Dalotel DM-160 Professional
 Dalotel DM.165 Viking

Damblanc-Lacoin 
 Damblanc–Lacoin Alérion helicopter

Damoure-Fabre-Lacroix
(Damoure, Jean Fabre and Léon Lacroix)
 Damoure-Fabre DF.5
 Damoure-Fabre-Lacroix DFL.6 Saphir

Danex Engineering
(Hungary)
Lamco Eurocub

Dansair 
(Faircraft Corp (consortium), Dansville, NY, 1946: Dansair Corp.)
 Dansair Coupe

Danton-Denhaut
 Danton-Denhaut 1910 biplane

Danville 
(Danville Aircraft Co (T D Ketchpaw), Danville, VA)
 Danville Sport Plane

DAR 
(D'rzhavna Aeroplanata Rabotilnica in Cyrillic ДАР - Държавната аеропланна работилница)
 DAR Uzunov-1 (DAR U-1) - DFW C.Va
 DAR 1 Peperuda ('Butterfly')
 DAR 2 - Albatros C.III
 DAR 3 Garvan ('Raven' or Laz-3)
 DAR 3(I) prototype
 DAR 3(I.bis)
 DAR Garvan-I
 DAR Garvan-II
 DAR Garvan-III
 DAR 4
 DAR 5 Brambar ('Beetle')
 DAR 6
 DAR 7
 DAR 7 SS.1
 DAR 8 Slavei (or Slavey, 'Nightingale')
 DAR 8A
 DAR 9 Siniger ('Titmouse' or 'Tomtit')
 DAR 10 Bekas ('Snipe')
 DAR 11 Lyastovitsa ('Swallow') - 50 planned licensed Czech Avia B.135s [unbuilt]
 DAR 13

DAR
(Аероплани ДАР ЕООД - DAR aeroplanes EOOD)
 DAR 21 Vector
 DAR 21S
 DAR-23
 DAR 25 Impuls
 DAR Solo
 DAR Speedster

DARA 
(Dayton Air Race Associates, Dayton, OH, constructed by WBB Associates, Dayton, OH)
 DARA Special

Dare 
((Melvin E) Dare Aircraft Corp, 6003 14 St, Detroit, MI)
 Dare Safety Airplane

Darcissac-Grinvalds
(Jaques Darcissac - Jean Grinvalds)
 Darcissac-Grinvalds DG-87 Goéland

DARPA 
(Defense Advanced Research Projects Agency)
 Boeing X-37
 Boeing X-45
 FALCON Hypersonic Weapon System/Hypersonic Cruise Vehicle 
 General Atomics MQ-1 Predator unmanned drone
 Hypersonic Research Program
 Integrated Sensor is Structure unmanned airship 
 Northrop Grumman Switchblade unmanned oblique-wing aircraft
 System F6 Fractionated Spacecraft distributed satellite demonstrator

Dart
(Dart Aircraft, United States)
 Dart Skycycle

Dart 
(Dart Aircraft Ltd)
 Dart Cambridge
 Dart Totternhoe
 Dart Flittermouse
 Dart Pup
 Dart Kitten
 Dart Grunau Baby
 Dart Zögling
 Dart replica Lilienthal glider
 Dart replica Cayley glider
 Dart replica Wright glider
 Dart Weasel

Dart 
(Dart Mfg Corporation)
 Dart G
 Dart GC
 Dart GK
 Dart GW
 Dart GW Special

Dashatou 
See:  Xianyi

Daspect
 Daspect III

Dassault 
 Dassault Balzac V
 Dassault Barougan
 Dassault Étendard II
 Dassault Étendard IV
 Dassault Étendard VI
 Dassault Falcon 5X
 Dassault Falcon 6X
 Dassault Falcon 7X
 Dassault Falcon 8X
 Dassault Falcon 9X
 Dassault Falcon 10
 Dassault Falcon 10X
 Dassault Falcon 20
 Dassault Falcon 50
 Dassault Falcon 100
 Dassault Falcon 200
 Dassault Falcon 900
 Dassault Falcon 2000
 Dassault Falcon Cargo Jet
 Dassault Falcon Guardian
 Dassault LOGIDUC
 Dassault Méditerranée
 Dassault Mercure
 Dassault Mercure 100
 Dassault Milan
 Dassault Mirage III
 Dassault Mirage IIIV
 Dassault Mirage 5
 Dassault Mirage 50
 Dassault Mirage IV
 Dassault Mirage 2000
 Dassault Mirage 4000
 Dassault Mirage F1
 Dassault Mirage F2
 Dassault Mirage F3
 Dassault Mirage G
 Dassault Mirage G-8
 Dassault Mystère 20
 Dassault nEUROn
 Dassault Rafale
 Dassault Super Étendard
 Dassault Super Mystère
 Dassault MD 80 ABC
 Dassault MD 303
 Dassault MD 311
 Dassault MD 312
 Dassault MD 315 Flamant
 Dassault MD 316T
 Dassault MD 320 Hirondelle
 Dassault MD 410 Spirale
 Dassault MD 415 Communauté
 Dassault MD 415M Diplomate
 Dassault MD 450 Ouragan
 Dassault MD 452 Mystère II
 Dassault MD 453 Mystère IIIN
 Dassault MD 454 Mystère IV
 Dassault MD 455 Spirale III
 Dassault MD 550 Mirage

Dassault-Breguet
 Dassault-Breguet Atlantique
 Dassault Breguet CC-117 Falcon Canadian Armed Forces
 Dassault Breguet Dornier Alpha Jet

Dassy 
 Dassy Da.1
 Dassy DA.2

Dätwyler
 Dätwyler 1038 MDC Trailer
 Dätwyler Lerche
 Dätwyler MD-3 Swiss Trainer

Dauby 
(Dauby Equipment Co, 2100 Hyde Park Blvd, Los Angeles, CA)
 Dauby Twin Navion

Daugherty 
(Earl Daugherty, Long Beach, CA)
 Daugherty 1915 Biplane

Daurelle 
(Paul Daurelle)
 Daurelle AD.01

Davenport 
(Bradley Davenport, Colorado Aero Tech.)
 Davenport BD-2 Nuggit

Davidson 
(George L O Davidson, Denver, CO)
 Davidson Air-Car

Davis 
((Walter C) Davis Aircraft Corp, Richmond, IN)
 Davis D-1
 Davis Racer
 Davis V-3

Davis
(Arthur J Davis, E Lansing, MI)
 Davis Racer

Davis
(H R Davis, Hobart, IN)
 Davis Challis B

Davis
(Charles M Davis, Pauls Valley, OK)
 Davis Special
 Davis Sport

Davis
((Leon) D Davis Aircraft Corp, Lake Village, IN, 1976: Stanton, TX)
 Davis DA-1
 Davis DA-2
 Davis DA-2A
 Davis DA-3
 Davis DA-5
 Davis DA-5A
 Davis DA-6
 Davis DA-7
 Davis DA-8
 Davis DA-9 Super Pocket Rocket
 Davis DA-10
 Davis DA-11

Davis
(Gilbert Davis, Nampa ID. 19??: Davis Wing Ltd, Boise, ID)
 Davis Starship Alpha

Davis-Douglas Company
(see #Douglas)
 Douglas Cloudster
 Davis-Douglas DT
 Davis-Douglas DTB

Dawson 
(C R Dawson, Glenn W Johnson & Clay Henley, Coeur d'Alene, ID)
 Dawson Pistol Ball
 Dawson Pistol Ball II

Day 
(Charles Healy Day, Paterson, NJ)
 Day 1910 Tractor
 Day A a.k.a. Special

Days 
(Robert R Days, Wadsworth, OH)
 Days Comet Sport

Dayton 
(See Pheasant Aircraft Company)

Dayton-Wright 
 Dayton-Wright XO-3
 Dayton-Wright XPS-1
 Dayton-Wright TA-3
 Dayton-Wright TA-5
 Dayton-Wright TW-3
 Dayton-Wright Aerial Coupe
 Dayton-Wright Bug
 Dayton-Wright Bull Head
 Dayton-Wright Cabin Cruiser
 Dayton-Wright Chummy
 Dayton-Wright DH-4
 Dayton-Wright DWH-4 Blue Bird
 Dayton-Wright FP.2
 Dayton-Wright FS
 Dayton-Wright KT
 Dayton-Wright Limousine
 Dayton-Wright M-1
 Dayton-Wright Messenger
 Dayton-Wright OW-1
 Dayton-Wright RB-1 Racer
 Dayton-Wright RB-1
 Dayton-Wright SDW
 Dayton-Wright T-4
 Dayton-Wright USXB
 Dayton-Wright WA
 Dayton-Wright WD
 Dayton-Wright WS
 Dayton-Wright Nine-Hour Cruiser

Daytona 
(Daytona Aircraft Construction Inc, Deland, FL)
 Daytona D-120
 Daytona D-160
 Daytona D-180
 Daytona D-200
 Daytona D-250
 Daytona D-270
 Daytona D-300

de Bernardi 
(Mario de Bernardi)
 de Bernardi M.d.B. 02 Aeroscooter

de Berry 
(E P de Berry, Pacific Aero Club, Los Angeles, CA)
 de Berry 1911 Biplane

de Bolotoff 
(de Bolotoff Aeroplane Works, Sevenoaks, Kent, United Kingdom)
 de Bolotoff 1913 triplane
 de Bolotoff SDEB 14

de Bothezat 
(George de Bothezat)
 de Bothezat 1922 helicopter
 de Bothezat GB-5 (1940)

de Boysson
 de Boysson A-3

de Brageas
 de Brageas Type E

de Bruyère 
 de Bruyère C1

de Bruyne 
(Aero Research Limited)
 de Bruyne Snark
 de Bruyne-Maas Ladybird

de Busschere 
(Donald de Busschere)
 de Busschere Skylark I
 de Busschere Skylark II

de Chenne 
(DeChenne (or Monett) Motor & Aeroplane Co (Pres: L B Durnil), Monett, MO)
 de Cheenne 1911 Biplane a.k.a. 'Monett Biplane' and 'Dechene-Sowers' (sic)

de Glymes 
(Raoul de Glymes de Hollebecque)
 de Glymes DG-X (DG-10)
 De Glymes Colanhan

de Havens & Watkins 
(Claude de Haven & A C Watkins, San Francisco, CA)
 de Havens & Watkins 1909 Monoplane

de Havilland 
(for Geoffrey de Havilland's "DH" designs before the DH.14, see Airco)

 de Havilland DH.14 Okapi
 de Havilland DH.16
 de Havilland DH.18
 de Havilland DH.27 Derby
 de Havilland DH.29 Doncaster
 de Havilland DH.32
 de Havilland DH.34
 de Havilland DH.37
 de Havilland DH.42 Dormouse
 de Havilland DH.50
 de Havilland DH.51
 de Havilland DH.53 Humming Bird
 de Havilland DH.54 Highclere
 de Havilland DH.56 Hyena
 de Havilland DH.60 Moth
 de Havilland DH.60X Moth
 de Havilland DH.60M Moth
 de Havilland DH.60G Gipsy Moth 
 de Havilland DH.60 Genet Moth 
 de Havilland DH.60T Moth Trainer 
 de Havilland DH.60GIII Moth Major
 de Havilland DH.61 Giant Moth
 de Havilland DH.65 Hound
 de Havilland DH.66 Hercules
 de Havilland DH.71 Tiger Moth
 de Havilland DH.72
 de Havilland DH.75 Hawk Moth
 de Havilland DH.77
 de Havilland DH.80 Puss Moth
 de Havilland DH.81 Swallow Moth
 de Havilland DH.82 Tiger Moth
 de Havilland DH.82A Tiger Moth
 de Havilland DH.82C Tiger Moth
 de Havilland DH.82C Menasco Moth
 de Havilland PT-24
 de Havilland DH.83 Fox Moth
 de Havilland DH.84 Dragon
 de Havilland DH.85 Leopard Moth
 de Havilland DH.86 Express
 de Havilland DH.87 Hornet Moth
 de Havilland DH.88 Comet
 de Havilland DH.89 Dragon Rapide
 de Havilland DH.90 Dragonfly
 de Havilland DH.91 Albatross
 de Havilland DH.92 Dolphin
 de Havilland DH.93 Don
 de Havilland DH.94 Moth Minor
 de Havilland DH.95 Flamingo
 de Havilland DH.98 Mosquito
 de Havilland DH.99 Mosquito
 de Havilland DH.100 Vampire
 de Havilland DH.101 Mosquito
 de Havilland DH.102 Mosquito
 de Havilland DH.103 Hornet
 de Havilland DH.104 Dove
 de Havilland DH.106 Comet
 de Havilland DH.108 Swallow
 de Havilland DH.110 Sea Vixen
 de Havilland DH.113 Vampire
 de Havilland DH.112 Venom
 de Havilland DH.112 Sea Venom
 de Havilland DH.114 Heron
 de Havilland DH.115 Vampire Trainer
 de Havilland DH.121 Trident
 de Havilland DH.125 Jet Dragon

 de Havilland Aeronautical Technical School 
 de Havilland T.K.1
 de Havilland T.K.2
 de Havilland T.K.3
 de Havilland T.K.4
 de Havilland T.K.5

 de Havilland Australia 
 de Havilland Australia DHA-G1
 de Havilland Australia DHA-G2
 de Havilland Australia DHA-3 Drover

 de Havilland Canada 
 de Havilland Canada DHC-1 Chipmunk
 de Havilland Canada DHC-2 Beaver
 de Havilland Canada DHC-3 Otter
 de Havilland Canada DHC-4 Caribou
 de Havilland Canada DHC-5 Buffalo
 de Havilland Canada DHC-6 Twin Otter
 de Havilland Canada Dash 7
 de Havilland Canada Dash 8
 de Havilland Canada CC-108
 de Havilland Canada CC-115
 de Havilland Canada CT-120
 de Havilland Canada C-127
 de Havilland Canada CSR-123
 de Havilland Canada CC-132
 de Havilland Canada CC-138
 de Havilland Canada CC-142
 de Havilland Canada CT-142
 de Havilland Canada AC-1
 de Havilland Canada AC-2
 de Havilland Canada C-7
 de Havilland Canada C-8
 de Havilland Canada CV-2
 de Havilland Canada CV-7
 de Havilland Canada E-9
 de Havilland Canada L-20
 de Havilland Canada O-5
 de Havilland Canada U-1
 de Havilland Canada U-6
 de Havilland Canada UV-18

de Kalbermatten
(Laurent de Kalbermatten, Villars-sur-Glâne, Switzerland)
Kalbermatten Woopy

 de Kallis 
((---) DeKallis, California)
 de Kallis Air Truck

 de Knight 
(William "Bart" de Knight, Levittown, PA)
 de Knight Special

 de Lackner 
((Donald) de Lackner Helicopters Inc., Mt Vernon, NY)
 de Lackner DH-4 Heli-Vector
 de Lackner DH-5 Aerocycle
 de Lackner HO-2
 de Lackner HZ-1 Aerocycle
 de Lackner Model 125 Cloud Buster

 de Laurier 
(Dr James de Laurier, Canada)
 de Laurier 2001 Ornithopter

 de Lesseps 
(Paul de Lesseps)
 Monoplan de Lesseps

 de Lloyd Thompson 
 de Lloyd Thompson Looper

 de Lotty 
((Henri) DeLotty Flying School: de Lotty Aircraftsmen Co, San Francisco, CA)
 de Lotty 1929 Monoplane

de Marçay
(Société Anonyme d'Etudes et de Construction Aéronautique Edmond de Marçay - SAECA Edmond de Marçay)

de Marçay-Kluijtmans
(Edmond de Marçay & J. Kluijtmans)
 de Marçay-Kluijtmans 1907 Dirigeable
 de Marçay-Kluijtmans 1908 Dirigeable

de Marçay-Moonen
(Edmond de Marçay & Emile Moonen)
 de Marçay-Moonen 1911 monoplane
 de Marçay-Moonen 1912 monoplane 
 de Marçay-Moonen L'Abeille 
 de Marçay-Moonen 1912 2-seat monoplane
 de Marçay-Moonen 1913 floatplane racer
de Marçay-Moonen 1914 double-biplane canard 

de Marçay
(SAECA Edmond de Marçay or Anonyme d'Etudes et de Construction Aéronautique Edmond de Marçay)
 de Marçay 1
 de Marçay 2
 de Marçay 3
 de Marçay 4
 de Marçay 5
 de Marçay T-2
 de Marçay Limousine
 de Marçay Passe-Partout
 de Marçay single-seat tourer

de Monge
(Louis de Monge)
 De Monge DMP-1 (twin boom glider)
 de Monge 1914 monoplane
 Lumière-de Monge racer
 Buscaylet-de Monge 5/2
 Buscaylet-de Monge 7/3
 Buscaylet-de Monge 7-4
 Buscaylet-de Monge 7-5
 Buscaylet-de Monge 8/1 CN.2
 Buscaylet-de Monge 9/1
 Buscaylet-de Monge 10/1 C.2
 de Monge 120 RN.3
 de Monge 140 BN.4
 de Monge 5/1 (racer - Lumière-de Monge racer?)
 de Monge 6/1 (amphibian project)
 de Monge M-101
 de Monge M-160
 de Monge Live Wing monoplane

 de Pischof 
(Alfred de Pischof)
 de Pischoff 1907 biplane
 de Pischof 1911 Autoplan
 de Pischof Avionnette 1920
 de Pischof Estafette 1922

de Rouge
(Charles de Rouge)
 de Rouge Elytroplan
 de Rouge Elytroplan-Lateron

 de Schelde 
(NV Koninklijke Maatschappij de Schelde)
 de Schelde Scheldemusch
 de Schelde Scheldemeeuw
 de Schelde S.12Damen Schelde Naval Shipbuilding#Vliegtuigbouw, Retrieved 5 November 2011
 de Schelde S.20
 de Schelde S.21

 de Vastey 
(Georges de Vastey)
 Georges de Vastey G-1 Papillon
 Georges de Vastey G-2

de Viscaya
(Pierre de Viscaya)
 de Viscaya PV-102

De Vore
 Verilite Sunbird

 de Witt 
(Albert H de Witt, Gary, IN)
 de Witt T-1

 Dean 
(Herbert F Dean, Flint, MI)
 Dean Delt-Air 250

 Dean 
(Carlyle W Dean, VA)
 Dean Parasol

 Debreyer 
(Jean-Claude Debreyer)
 Debreyer JCD-02 Pélican
 Debreyer JCD-03 Pélican

Decazes
(Viscount Decazes and G. Besancon)
 Decazes Helicoplane

 Dechaux 
(Dechaux)
 Dechaux Helicop-jet

 Dedalus 
 Dedalus Poppy

Deekay
(Deekay Aircraft Corporation Ltd.)
 Deekay Knight

 Deicke 
(Arthur Deicke)
 Deicke ADM 1
 Deicke ADM 2
 Deicke ADM 3
 Deicke ADM 4
 Deicke ADM 5
 Deicke ADM 6
 Deicke ADM 8
 Deicke ADM 9
 Deicke ADM 10
 Deicke ADM-11
 Deicke 1931 biplane (tricycle and tail-skid u/c)

Dejouy
(Jacques Dejouy)
 Dejouy 4 BA

 Del Mar 
(Bruce Del Mar / Del Mar Engineering Laboratories, Los Angeles CA.)
 Del Mar DH-1A Whirlymite
 Del Mar DH-1B Whirlymite
 Del Mar DH-1C Whirlymite
 Del Mar DH-2 Whirlymite
 Del Mar DH-2A Whirlymite Scout
 Del Mar DH-2C Target Drone
 Del Mar DH-20 Whirlymite Tandem

 Deland 
(Orlando Helicopter Airways, Deland, FL)
 Deland Travel Air 2000

Delanne
(Maurice Delanne, France)
 Delanne DL-10
 Delanne 11
 Delanne DL-20T
 Delanne 30 P2
 Delanne 60 E1
 Delanne DL-70
 Delanne DL-150
 Delanne DL-160
 Delanne DL-190

Delannoy
(Guy Delannoy)
 Delannoy helicopter

 Delasalle-Lesage 
(Gérard Feugray and Christian Lesage)
 Delasalle-Lesage DL.260
 Delasalle-Lesage DL.340

 Delattre 
(Jacques Delattre)
 Delattre Potez 6

Délémontez-Cauchy
(Jean Délémontez et Alain Cauchy)
 Délémontez-Cauchy DC.1

Délémontez-Desjardins
(Jean Délémontez et Jacques Desjardins)
 Délémontez-Desjardins D.01 Ibis

Délémontez-Miettaux
(Jean Délémontez &t Lucien Miettaux)
 Délémontez-Miettaux DM.01 Bébé Spécial

 Deleray 
(Deleray Aircraft Works, Freeport, NY)
 Deleray D-5 Sport Plane

 Delgado 
(Delgado Trades School, New Orleans, LA (now Delgado Community College))
 Delgado Flash
 Delgado Maid
 Higgins Rotorplane

Delta Helicopters
(Delta Helicopters, Tanah Merah, Queensland, Australia)
Delta D2

Delta Sailplane Corporation
Delta Sailplane Honcho
Delta Sailplane Nomad

 Delta System Air 
 Delta Pegass

 Delvion 
(Jean DELmontez - Jacques VION)
 Delvion DR 100 Diésel 
 Delvion D 111 Diésel
 Delvion DVD (diésel)
 Delvion Zéphir

 Dementyev 
 Dementyev Mercury 6

 Deming 
(Gurnie A Deming, Lake Worth, FL)
 Deming Mid-wing

Demonty-Poncelet
 Demonty-Poncelet D.P.I
 Demonty-Poncelet Cambgul II
 Demonty-Poncelet Cyrano (Sabca)

 Dempsey 
(Tom Dempsey, Odessa, TX)
 Dempsey TD-2
 Dempsey TD-3 Beta Lightning

 Denel 
 Denel Rooivalk
 Denel Aerospace Systems Bateleur
 Denel SARA

Denhaut
(François Denhaut)

 Denhaut Type A (1911)
 Denhaut Type B (1912)
 Denhaut Hy.749 (1926/27 Denhaut design built by France-Aviation)

 Denize 
(Robert Denize)
 Denize RD.105 Raid Driver
 Denize RD.20 Raid Driver
 Denize RD.125 Raid Driver
 Denize RD.135 Raid Driver

 Denney 
(Denney Aerocraft)
 Denney Kitfox
 Denney Kitfox II
 Denney Kitfox III
 Denney Kitfox IV (XL)

 Denoix 
(Élie Denoix)
 Denoix ED.5 Demoiselle

 Deperdussin 
(Société Pour les Appareils Deperdussin)
(Note: there is much confusion over Deperdussin's aircraft so the listed aircraft here may refer to the same item, hopefully all will be revealed later)
 Deperdussin Type A
 Deperdussin Type B Sports
 Deperdussin Type C
 Deperdussin Type D Monocoque
 Deperdussin T
 Deperdussin TT
 Deperdussin Coupe Schneider
 Deperdussin Type B concours militaire 1911
 Deperdussin 1912 Racing Monoplane
 Deperdussin Monocoque
 De Feure-Deperdussin No.2 Monoplane
 British Deperdussin Seagull

Desaer
 Desaer ATL-100

Descamps
(Elisée Alfred Descamps)
 Descamps 16
 Descamps 17
 Descamps 27
 Descamps-Brunet DB-16

 Descatoire 
(Christian Descatoire)
 Descatoire CD.01 Astuss

Desjardin
 Desjardin Beaver des Pauvres

 Desoutter 
 Desoutter Mk.I
 Desoutter Mk.II

 Detemple 
(Detemple Helicopter Inc, Venice, CA)
 Detemple DH-28

 Detroit 
 Detroit DAC-2C
 Detroit G-1 Gull
 Detroit E-2 Sea Rover
 Detroit ZMC-2 (Zeppelin Metal Clad-2)
 Detroit DL-1 Vega
 Detroit DL-2 Sirius
 Detroit DL-2A Altair
 Detroit YP-24
 Detroit TE-1
 Detroit Y1P-24
 Detroit Y1A-9
 Detroit AirSpaceX

 Detroit Cleveland 
 Detroit Cleveland Airship

Dewald
(Bad Schönborn, Germany)
Dewald Sunny

 Dewey 
(Jim Dewey, Santa Paula, CA)
 Dewey 1966 Monoplane
 Dewey Bird

 Dewoitine 
(Emile Dewoitine - Société Aéronautique Française, formerly Constructions Aéronautiques E. Dewoitine, nationalized in 1936 as Société Nationale de Constructions Aéronautiques du Midi'' (SNCAM))
 Dewoitine AXD
 Dewoitine P-1
 Dewoitine P-2
 Dewoitine P-3
 Dewoitine P-4
 Dewoitine D.1
 Dewoitine D.2
 Dewoitine D.3
 Dewoitine D.4
 Dewoitine D.5
 Dewoitine D.6
 Dewoitine D.7
 Dewoitine D.8
 Dewoitine D.9
 Dewoitine D.10
 Dewoitine D.12
 Dewoitine D.13
 Dewoitine D.14
 Dewoitine D.15
 Dewoitine D.17
 Dewoitine D.18
 Dewoitine D.19
 Dewoitine D.21
 Dewoitine D.22
 Dewoitine D.23
 Dewoitine D.24
 Dewoitine D.25
 Dewoitine D.26
 Dewoitine D.27
 Dewoitine D.28
 Dewoitine D.30
 Dewoitine D.31
 Dewoitine D.33 Trait d'Union
 Dewoitine D.332 Emeraude
 Dewoitine D.333
 Dewoitine D.337
 Dewoitine D.338
 Dewoitine D.342
 Dewoitine D.35
 Dewoitine D.37
 Dewoitine D.371
 Dewoitine D.373
 Dewoitine D.40
 Dewoitine HD.41
 Dewoitine HD.411
 Dewoitine HD-412
 Dewoitine D.420
 Dewoitine D.430
 Dewoitine D.440
 Dewoitine D.450
 Dewoitine HD.460
 Dewoitine D.470
 Dewoitine D.480
 Dewoitine D.490
 Dewoitine D.500
 Dewoitine D.501
 Dewoitine D.503
 Dewoitine D.510
 Dewoitine D.511
 Dewoitine D.513
 Dewoitine D.520
 Dewoitine D.521
 Dewoitine D.530
 Dewoitine D.531
 Dewoitine D.532
 Dewoitine D.535
 Dewoitine D.550
 Dewoitine D.551
 Dewoitine D.560
 Dewoitine D.570
 Dewoitine D.580
 Dewoitine D.590
 Dewoitine D.600
 Dewoitine D.620
 Dewoitine D.640
 Dewoitine D.650
 Dewoitine D.660
 Dewoitine D.680
 Dewoitine D.700
 Dewoitine D.710
 Dewoitine D.720
 Dewoitine HD.730
 Dewoitine D.750
 Dewoitine D.760
 Dewoitine D.770
 Dewoitine HD.780
 Dewoitine D.790
 Dewoitine D.800
 Dewoitine D.810
 Dewoitine D.820
 Dewoitine D.860
 Dewoitine D.900
 Dewoitine Navy Type D Carrier Fighter

References

Further reading

External links

 List of aircraft (D)

fr:Liste des aéronefs (C-D)